Australia competed at the 1964 Summer Olympics in Tokyo, Japan. 243 competitors, 203 men and 40 women, took part in 133 events in 19 sports. Australian athletes have competed in every Summer Olympic Games.

Medalists

Gold
 Betty Cuthbert — Athletics, Women's 400 m
 Robert Windle — Swimming, Men's 1500 m Freestyle
 Ian O'Brien — Swimming, Men's 200 m Breaststroke
 Kevin Berry — Swimming, Men's 200 m Butterfly
 Dawn Fraser — Swimming, Women's 100 m Freestyle
 William Northam, Peter O'Donnell, and James Sargeant — Sailing, Men's 5½ Meter Class

Silver
 Michele Brown — Athletics, Women's High Jump
 Lynette Bell, Dawn Fraser, Janice Murphy, and Robyn Thorn — Swimming, Women's 4 × 100 m Freestyle Relay

Bronze
 Ron Clarke — Athletics, Men's 10.000 m
 Marilyn Black — Athletics, Women's 200 m
 Judith Pollock — Athletics, Women's 400 m
 Pamela Kilborn — Athletics, Women's 80 m Hurdles
 Theodore Boronovskis — Judo, Men's Open Class
 Allan Wood — Swimming, Men's 400 m Freestyle
 Allan Wood — Swimming, Men's 1500 m Freestyle
 David Dickson, Peter Doak, John Ryan, and Robert Windle — Swimming, Men's 4 × 100 m Freestyle Relay
 David Dickson, Kevin Berry, Ian O'Brien, and Peter Reynolds — Swimming, Men's 4 × 100 m Medley Relay
 Mervyn Crossman, Paul Dearing, Raymond Evans, Brian Glencross, Robin Hodder, John McBryde, Donald McWatters, Patrick Nilan, Eric Pearce, Julian Pearce, Desmond Piper, Donald Smart, Anthony Waters, and Graham Wood — Field Hockey, Men's Team Competition

Athletics

Men's High Jump
Lawrie Peckham
 Qualifying Round — 2.06m
 Final — 2.09m (→ 10th place)

Women's 800 metres
Dixie Willis
 Heat — did not compete (→ did not advance)

Basketball

Men's Team Competition
Preliminary Round
 Lost to  45-78
 Defeated  81-62
 Lost to  70-74
 Defeated  64-58
 Lost to  59-61
 Lost to  57-58
 Lost to  57-69
Classification Matches
 9th-12th place: Defeated  70-58
 9th/10th place: Defeated  64-57 → 9th place
Team Roster
 Scott Davie
 Brendon Hackwill
 John Heard
 Bill Wyatt
 Michael Ah Matt
 Werner Linde
 Ken Cole
 Les Hody
 Carl Rodwell
 Mike Dancis
 Lindsay Gaze
 John Gardiner
Head coach: Keith Miller

Boxing

Canoeing

Cycling

14 cyclists represented Australia in 1964.

Individual road race
 Ray Bilney
 Michael Hollingsworth
 David Humphreys
 Malcolm McCredie

Sprint
 Thomas Harrison
 Gordon Johnson

1000m time trial
 Richard Paris

Tandem
 Ian Browne
 Daryl Perkins

Individual pursuit
 Richard Hine

Team pursuit
 Kevin Brislin
 Robert Baird
 Victor Browne
 Henk Vogels, Sr.

Diving

Equestrian

Fencing

18 fencers, 13 men and 5 women, represented Australia in 1964.

Men's foil
 David McKenzie
 Brian McCowage
 Ivan Lund

Men's team foil
 Gerard Tubier, David McKenzie, John Douglas, Brian McCowage, Ivan Lund

Men's épée
 John Humphreys
 Ivan Lund
 Russell Hobby

Men's team épée
 Russell Hobby, John Humphreys, Imants Terrauds, Ivan Lund, Ian Bowditch

Men's sabre
 Henry Sommerville
 Alexander Martonffy
 Les Tornallyay

Men's team sabre
 Alexander Martonffy, Les Tornallyay, Paul Rizzuto, Brian McCowage, Henry Sommerville

Women's foil
 Janet Hopner
 Jan Redman
 Johanna Winter

Women's team foil
 Jan Redman, Johanna Winter, Val Winter, Janet Hopner, Ulrike Winter

Gymnastics

Hockey

Judo

Modern pentathlon

Three male pentathletes represented Australia in 1964.

Individual
 Peter Macken
 Donald McMiken
 Duncan Page

Team
 Peter Macken
 Donald McMiken
 Duncan Page

Rowing

Sailing

Open

Shooting

Eight shooters represented Australia in 1964.
Men

Swimming

Water polo

First round

Group B

Weightlifting

Wrestling

Freestyle
Light Heavyweight
Hughie Williams

References

Nations at the 1964 Summer Olympics
1964
Olympics